Lapaeumides zerynthia is a moth in the Castniidae family. It is found in Brazil, in the Neotropical realm. This species is likely found in lowland tropical forests, but future research is needed to confirm this.

References

Moths described in 1838
Castniidae